Mammillaria albilanata is a species of plant in the family Cactaceae. It is endemic to Mexico.  Its natural habitat is hot deserts.

References
 Mammillarias.net page on M. albilanata. Accessed 2 May 2009.

Cacti of Mexico
albilanata